(RTÉ) (Irish for "Radio & Television of Ireland") is the national broadcaster of Ireland headquartered in Dublin. It both produces and broadcasts programmes on television, radio and online. The radio service began on 1 January 1926, while regular television broadcasts began on 31 December 1961, making it one of the oldest continuously operating public service broadcasters in the world. RTÉ also publishes a weekly listings and lifestyle magazine, the RTÉ Guide.

RTÉ is a statutory body, overseen by a board appointed by the Government of Ireland, with general management in the hands of the Executive Board, headed by the Director-General. RTÉ is regulated by the Broadcasting Authority of Ireland. RTÉ is financed by television licence fee and through advertising, with some of its services funded solely by advertising, while others are funded solely by the licence fee.

Radio Éireann, RTÉ's predecessor and at the time a section of the Department of Posts and Telegraphs, was one of 23 founding organisations of the European Broadcasting Union in 1950.

History

Establishment and name

Broadcasting in Ireland began in 1926 with 2RN in Dublin. From that date until June 1960 the broadcasting service (2RN, later Radio Éireann) operated as a section of the Department of Posts and Telegraphs, and those working for the service were directly employed by the Irish Government and regarded as civil servants.

RTÉ was established on 1 June 1960 (as Radio Éireann) under the Broadcasting Authority Act 1960, the principal legislation under which it still operates. The existing Radio Éireann service was transferred to the new authority, which was also made responsible for the new television service (Telefís Éireann). The television service started broadcasting on 31 December 1961, from the Kippure transmitter site near Dublin. Eamonn Andrews was the first Chairman of Radio Éireann, the first director-general was Edward Roth. The name of the authority was changed, at the suggestion of Áine Ní Cheanainn, to Radio Telefís Éireann by the Broadcasting Authority (Amendment) Act 1966, and both the radio and television services became known as RTÉ in that year.

Section 113 of the Broadcasting Act 2009 changed the name of the organisation from "Radio Telefís Éireann" to "Raidió Teilifís Éireann", to reflect the current standard spelling of the name in Irish.

The "É" in RTÉ is often pronounced as the English letter "E". However, "É" in Irish is pronounced like "ay". (Example: NCI/CNÉ)

Broadcasting ban
Under Section 31 of the Broadcasting Authority Act 1960 the Minister for Posts and Telegraphs of the day could direct RTÉ "not to broadcast any matter, or any matter of any particular class". In 1971 the first such directive was issued by Gerry Collins, directing RTÉ not to broadcast "any matter that could be calculated to promote the aims or activities of any organisation which engages in, promotes, encourages or advocates the attaining of any particular objective by violent means". A year later Collins dismissed the entire RTÉ Authority over a report of an interview with Seán Mac Stíofáin, the chief of staff of the Provisional IRA. RTÉ reporter Kevin O'Kelly had reported, not broadcast, his taped interview with Mac Stiofáin. He was jailed briefly for contempt in a court case arising out of the interview when Mac Stiofáin was charged with IRA membership. O'Kelly refused to identify Mac Stiofáin's as the voice on his unbroadcast interview. The tape had been seized from his house by the Garda Síochána (police).

In 1976, Section 31 was amended by Conor Cruise O'Brien as 1973-77 Minister for Posts & Telegraphs. He issued a new annually-based directive to the RTÉ authority, prohibiting the broadcast of interviews or reports of interviews with spokespersons for, or representatives of, Sinn Féin, the IRA and other named organisations. RTÉ was also banned from broadcasting interviews or reports of interviews with spokespersons for any organisation banned in Northern Ireland under the UK's Northern Ireland (Emergency Provisions) Act 1973. The directives were reissued on an annual basis, up to January 1993.

During the late 1970s, RTÉ was accused of extending the censorship rules into a system of self-censorship. A small minority of programme-makers also emerged who approved of Section 31, particularly supporters of the Workers' Party (formerly Sinn Féin the Workers' Party), including Eoghan Harris, and Gerry Gregg who opposed that party's official policy. Opponents of censorship were portrayed as secret IRA sympathizers, including then reporter, later Irish President, Mary McAleese. She described the experience as, "the most difficult, the darkest, the worst time of my life".

The effect of the Section 31 ban was more severe than the censorship provision introduced in 1988 in the United Kingdom. The UK ban prevented the direct speech of censored individuals. Broadcasters then used actors' voices to dub the recorded speech of censored persons. This was not permissible on RTÉ, which was prevented from broadcasting 'reports' of interviews. British broadcasters interpreted the term 'spokesperson' more loosely than RTÉ, which banned all Sinn Féin members whether or not they were speaking on behalf of the party. The BBC interviewed Sinn Féin President Gerry Adams as MP for West Belfast on 1 October 1990, speaking on unemployment in his constituency. Larry O'Toole, then an ordinary Sinn Féin member, mentioned this in a letter to RTÉ Director of News Joe Mulhollend on 30 October 1990, after O'Toole was banned by RTÉ as a spokesperson for striking bakery workers. O'Toole then challenged the RTÉ ban in the High Court. In 1992–93, in O'Toole vs RTÉ, RTÉ was found by the High Court and Supreme Court to have illegally and unconstitutionally extended the censorship ban to Sinn Féin members who were not speaking on behalf of Sinn Féin. The RTÉ ban did not affect UK stations broadcasting in the Republic of Ireland as, until 1988 at least, viewers in the Republic were still able to hear the voices of Sinn Féin representatives.

21st century
In 2004, RTÉ and the Minister for Communications, Marine and Natural Resources agreed that in future, RTÉ would operate under a Public Service Broadcasting Charter.

On 29 June 2005 the Minister appointed the members of a new RTÉ Authority, replacing the previous one appointed in June 2000. Fintan Drury, chairman of Platinum sports management, and also chairman of Paddy Power plc, was appointed chairman of RTÉ. The other members of the Authority are Maria Killian, Patricia King, Ian Malcolm, Patrick Marron, Una Ní Chonaire, Emer Finnan, Stephen O'Byrnes and Joe O'Brien. The new Authority would hold office for not more than three years. On 11 January 2006, Fintan Drury resigned as chairman of RTÉ, citing a potential conflict of interest in his role as an advisor to the organisers of the Ryder Cup golf tournament and as chairman of a broadcaster involved in a row over broadcasting rights. This occurred after Irish government proposals to add the tournament to the list of sports events which must be broadcast on free-to-air terrestrial television, to which British Sky Broadcasting, the rights holders, were objecting. On 22 February 2006, Mary Finan was appointed Chairperson of the RTÉ Authority.

In 2006, RTÉ was involved in a High Court case relating to referential bidding in relation to sponsoring weather forecasts: Smart Telecom PLC trading as Smart Telecom v Raidió Teilifís Éireann and by order Glanbia PLC.

In September 2006, the Government published the proposed text of the Broadcasting Bill 2006. It proposed that RTÉ and TG4 would become separate companies limited by guarantee, with the Minister as sole member of both companies (CLGs do not have shareholders). RTÉ would be legally obliged to agree a charter every five years and publish a statement of commitments every year, and be under the jurisdiction of the proposed Broadcasting Authority of Ireland. The bill was delayed, but was finally introduced into Dáil Éireann on 14 April 2008. The Broadcasting Act 2009 retains RTÉ as a statutory corporation, but renamed the RTÉ Authority as the RTÉ Board and made changes to the way it is appointed. It also renamed the corporation Raidió Teilifís Éireann. with the Irish Times noting that this thereby fixed a "spelling error that lasted 40 years". In the meantime, the Broadcasting (Amendment) Act 2007 awarded RTÉ control of one multiplex for digital terrestrial television and giving it responsibilities in relation to broadcasting outside the state. In line with this, RTÉ and the government were currently in discussions with regard to a new channel proposed for to launch outside the Republic, which initially had the working titles of Diaspora TV, and later RTÉ International. In April 2007, TG4 became an independent statutory corporation, having previously been a wholly owned subsidiary of RTÉ since its inception. RTÉ continues to contribute programmes to the channel, including Nuacht TG4.

In July 2007, RTÉ began participating in a HD trial in Dublin, showing programmes such as Planet Earth and Gaelic Athletic Association matches. RTÉ announced its plan to launch two further television channels; one general entertainment channel – RTÉ Three (working name) – and a timeshift service for RTÉ One – RTÉ One +1 (working name).

On 24 February 2009 the Minister for Communications, Energy, and Natural Resources, appointed the members of a new RTÉ Authority, replacing the previous one appointed in June 2006. Tom Savage of the Communications Clinic was appointed chairman of RTÉ. The other members of the Authority were Patricia Quinn, Karlin Lillington, Fergus Armstrong, Alan Gilsenan, Seán O'Sullivan, Emer Finnan. Cathal Goan then Director General, RTÉ as an ex-officio member of the Authority. The new Authority held office for not more than six months, due to changes planned under the Broadcasting Act 2009 which became law on 12 July 2009, dissolving the authority, and replacing it with an RTÉ Board. Under Section 179 (3) of the Act, any person who was a member of the Authority when the Act was signed into law continues as a member of the Board until the end of their term of office on 24 August 2009. Unlike the RTÉ Authority, the RTÉ Board has not the self-regulatory function over RTÉ, as this was transferred to a newly appointed Broadcasting Authority of Ireland that replaces the Broadcasting Commission of Ireland regulating commercial TV and radio. This helps assuage any concerns of the potential for bias that could be perceived under previous self-regulation by having a single regulator of public service and commercial Irish broadcasters into the future.

In 2009, RTÉ apologised to the then Taoiseach Brian Cowen for its role in the Brian Cowen nude portraits controversy. Future Taoiseach Enda Kenny and Charles Flanagan called RTÉ's backtracking a restriction on freedom of expression, and Liz McManus of the Labour Party criticised RTÉ for "bow[ing] to political pressure".

On 1 June 2009, the Sunday Independent reported that RTÉ was on the brink of bankruptcy. Such reports are denied by RTÉ, though the organisation acknowledges how under the current financial structure there is "serious financial difficulty" and a review of its financial procedures is underway and to be completed by 2010. On 11 June 2009 the Director General of RTÉ Cathal Goan reported to the Oireachtas that RTÉ was not bankrupt and that it would break even by year end On 3 July 2009, the RTÉ 2008 Annual Report was published. The organisation broke even in 2008. On 29 September 2009, RTÉ revealed a proposal for the regeneration of its existing building estimated to cost €350 million. If approved, the project would see the gradual replacement over a 10- to 15-year period of most of the current 1960s and 1970s buildings on the Donnybrook site. The new building would accommodate the switch over to high-definition, additional channels and new studios. RTÉ has since received planning consent from Dublin City Council for an application for the redevelopment of the station's Donnybrook site.The proposal for redevelopment of the site was accepted by local councillors last November 2009.The next stage of the planning process involves all parties having an opportunity to lodge appeals with An Bord Pleanála over the coming four weeks (by May 2010). The proposal would also involve building a new entrance onto the N11 Stillorgan dual carriageway.

The death of RTÉ broadcaster Gerry Ryan led to controversy for RTÉ when it emerged that traces of cocaine were the "likely trigger" of the star's sudden death on 30 April 2010. Drugs Minister Pat Carey said he was "a bit taken aback, first of all, by the whole attitude of RTÉ over the last while" concerning the circumstances of Ryan's death. Comparing Ryan's cocaine use to the 2007 death of model Katy French, Carey said that the media were "very judgmental" when French died but it had now "come home to roost in their own case".

In September 2010, RTÉ broadcast a controversial nine-minute radio interview with Taoiseach Brian Cowen from a Fianna Fáil think-in in Galway. The interview led to increased pressure for Cowen to resign in the days that followed after it was thought he had been drunk on the radio.

Noel Curran was appointed Director-General of RTÉ from 1 February 2011 on 9 November 2010 for five years, replacing Cathal Goan who had decided not to seek an extension to the seven-year term which ended at end of January 2011. It was announced on 1 April 2016 that Dee Forbes would be the new Director General.

In 2011, RTÉ was sued for defamation after making false allegations about a priest. On 23 May 2011, RTÉ had aired a Prime Time Investigates programme called Mission to Prey, which falsely claimed that the priest had raped a woman and fathered her child while working as a missionary in Kenya. In October 2011, RTÉ issued a public apology, stating that the allegations were baseless and should never have been broadcast. The priest said he had been "living a nightmare" after the broadcaster made the allegations. The issue was serious enough to be discussed in both houses of the Oireachtas. In November 2011, the priest concerned reached an out-of-court settlement with RTÉ, in which RTÉ agreed that it had seriously libelled him, and paid the priest a significant amount of money in damages. As a consequence, managing director of news Ed Mulhall retired, current affairs editor Ken O'Shea was moved to another department, and reporter Aoife Kavanagh resigned. The affair was described as "one of the gravest editorial mistakes ever made" in RTÉ's history.

In October 2011, RTÉ was forced to stop a "share deal" scheme it had offered advertisers when TV3 complained to the Competition Authority.

On 24 October 2011, three days before the 2011 Irish presidential election, RTÉ hosted the final presidential debate on Pat Kenny's The Frontline, in which it controversially broadcast an unverified tweet mid-debate which was widely seen as damaging to the frontrunner candidate Seán Gallagher. Gallagher had been the frontrunner in an opinion poll at this point. On election day, Gallagher received 28.5% of first preference votes in the election, leaving him in second place behind Michael D. Higgins. The Guardian, chronicling the reasons for Gallagher's fall in support, reported that a final RTÉ poll showed that 28% of Irish voters had changed their mind in the last week of the campaign, with 58% of those switching from Gallagher. On 7 March 2012, the Broadcasting Authority of Ireland upheld Gallagher's complaint about unfair treatment regarding how RTÉ handled the unverified tweet on the final Pat Kenny debate.  On 19 December 2017, it was reported that RTÉ had agreed to pay Gallagher a sum of €130,000 as part of a confidential legal settlement arising from the debate.

In 2012, RTÉ broadcast advertisements on Christmas Day in a break with tradition.

Income and expenditure

Budget
The following figures were issued by RTÉ as part of their annual report in 2012. In 2012 RTÉ received in total €180,894,000 in public funding from the licence fee, it also received €127,100,000 in commercial revenue. RTÉ total expenditure in 2012 was €327,023,000. They had restructuring costs of €46,161,000 in 2012. Losses for the year came to €65,147,000.

Profit and Loss across radio, television and online services.

RTÉ receives income from two main sources:
 The television licence fee. Within the State, it is necessary to pay a fee of €160 per annum to legally possess any piece of equipment capable of receiving television signals (not necessarily those of RTÉ). This money is collected by An Post on behalf of the Minister for Tourism, Culture, Arts, Gaeltacht, Sport and Media. The state pays for TV Licence Inspectors who have the power to obtain and execute search warrants of private houses. Failure to possess a valid television licence can result in a fine and a criminal record.
 Commercial revenue including the sale of advertising and sponsorship. In the early 1990s Minister Ray Burke imposed commercial revenue quotas to limit the amount of revenue that RTÉ could procure through advertising, in view of the corporation's licence fee income. While such quotas were later removed RTÉ Radio and Television is still limited to 6 minutes of advertising per hour. The commercial division owned 0.086% of the Intelsat satellite firm, which it sold in 2005.

Even though commercial quotas have been removed, commercial revenue and the license fee each contribute roughly half of the organization's income. The licence fee does not fund RTÉ 2fm, RTÉ Aertel, RTÉ Guide or the website RTÉ.ie, however, each of these brands are indirectly funded by the licence fee through the use of content that is funded by the licence fee, such as News and Current Affairs.

Breakdown of the licence fee

RTÉ personality salaries
RTÉ's Director General in October 2009 said there was "no question that by today's standards" the salaries paid to its top presenters in 2008 "were excessive. I have to repeat that they were set at a different time in a different competitive reality where some of this talent might be up for poaching by other organisations and in RTÉ's view at the time, they delivered value for money ". Fine Gael said the high salaries were "rubbing salt in the wounds" for people who had lost their jobs or taken significant pay cuts. Labour criticised RTÉ for not releasing the data sooner and said "This information should be easily available and there should be no question of concealing it or making it in any way inaccessible ". Many of the highest-paid stars are not technically members of staff but are paid through separate companies, enabling them and the station to avoid paying tax on their salaries.

In January 2021, RTÉ published the list of salaries paid to its top 10 personalities in 2019:

 Ryan Tubridy: €495,000
 Ray D'Arcy: €450,000
 Joe Duffy: €392,494
 Marian Finucane: €358,013
 Sean O'Rourke: €327,988
 Miriam O'Callaghan: €320,000
 Claire Byrne: €250,000
 Brendan O'Connor: €220,000
 Bryan Dobson: €209,282
 Mary Wilson: €196,961

Organisation

RTÉ Board and Executive Board
RTÉ is a statutory corporation. Under its original governance arrangements (under the Broadcasting Authority Act 1960) its board was known as the RTÉ Authority. The members of the RTÉ Authority were appointed by the Cabinet upon the recommendation of the Minister for Communications, Marine and Natural Resources. The RTÉ Authority was both the legal owner of RTÉ (under the 1960 Act, it was RTÉ) and was also its regulator.

Under the Broadcasting Act 2009, RTÉ's governance arrangements have changed. The statutory corporation form has been retained, but the new Act no longer refers to the board of RTÉ as an "Authority" and it is now simply known as the Board. Of the 12 members of the Board which replaced the RTÉ Authority, the Minister appoints six, the Oireachtas Committee on the Environment, Climate and Communications decides on four names to present to the Minister for appointment, one member is elected by the staff of RTÉ, and the Director General sits on the Board ex officio. The final members of the RTÉ Authority were reappointed to the new Board in the interim. The provisions of the Act relating to the Broadcasting Authority of Ireland were commenced on 1 October 2009 (under Statutory Instrument 389 of 2009 of the Broadcasting Act 2009), RTÉ is externally regulated by the Broadcasting Authority of Ireland.

The RTÉ organisation is divided into six integrated business divisions (termed "IBDs" within RTÉ): RTÉ Television, RTÉ Radio, RTÉ News and Current Affairs, RTÉ Network, RTÉ Digital and RTÉ Orchestras Quartet & Choirs, together with Centrally Incurred Shared Services (Group Communications, Legal & Treasury, Central HR & IT Support, Group Insurance & Pension, Property and Site Facilities, RTÉ Guide Production, Publication & Advertising Sales) and a Corporate Headquarters. The Irish-language channel, TG4, was operated as a subsidiary of RTÉ (Serbhisí Telefís na Gaeilge Teoranta) prior to its separation from RTÉ on 1 April 2007.

The RTÉ Board appoints the Director-General of RTÉ who in effect fulfils the dual role of chief executive and of Editor in Chief. The Director-General heads the executive board of RTÉ, which comprises the company's top management and includes the chief financial officer, the Director of Communications and the managing directors of the television, radio, and news divisions.

Broadcasting

Radio

The first voice broadcast of 2RN, the original radio callsign for Radio 1, took place on 14 November 1925 when Seamus Clandillon, the 2RN station director said, 'Seo Raidió 2RN, Baile Átha Cliath ag tástáil', Irish for 'This is Radio 2RN, Dublin calling'. Regular Irish radio-broadcasting began on 1 January 1926. Unfortunately, most Irish people could not receive 2RN's (1.5 kilowatt) signal. When faced with numerous complaints from Cork regarding the writers' inability to tune to the signal, Clandillon remarked in The Irish Radio Review, a magazine dedicated to the service, that they did not know how to operate their sets. 6CK was established in Cork in 1927; much of 6CK's output was simply a relay of the national service but it also had a significant input into the programmes of 2RN until it was closed down in the 1950s.

A high-power (initially 60 kW) station was established in Athlone, in 1932, to coincide with the staging of the Eucharistic Congress. 2RN, 6CK and Athlone became known as "Radio Athlone" and were receivable across virtually the entire country. Radio Athlone became known as "Radio Éireann" in 1938.

Radio Éireann tried to satisfy all tastes on a single channel (with very limited programming hours). However, this resulted in a rather conservative programming policy. It was barely tolerated by most Irish listeners, and usually trounced (particularly on the east coast and along the Northern Ireland border) by the BBC and later Radio Luxembourg. This did not really change until Radio Éireann became free of direct government control in the 1960s.
In 1973 the radio service moved from the GPO in the centre of Dublin, where it had been housed since 1928, into a new purpose-built Radio Centre beside the existing Television Centre on the Donnybrook campus.

Now, RTÉ has a nationwide communications network with an increasing emphasis on regional news-gathering and input. Broadcasting on Radio 1 provides comprehensive coverage of news, current affairs, music, drama and variety features, agriculture, education, religion and sport, mostly in English but also some Irish. RTÉ 2fm is a popular music and chat channel which commenced broadcasting as RTÉ Radio 2 on 31 May 1979, Brendan Balfe being the first voice to be heard on the station at midday when he introduced the first presenter, Larry Gogan. RTÉ lyric fm serves the interests of classical music and the arts, coming on air in May 1999, and replacing FM3 Classical Music, which had catered for the same target audience and time-shared with RTÉ Raidió na Gaeltachta, an exclusively Irish language service, which first began broadcasting on Easter Sunday, 2 April 1972.
Formerly RTÉ operated RTÉ Radio Cork (previously 'Cork 89FM' and 'RTÉ Cork Local Radio'), a local radio service in Cork, but this closed down in 2000.

A slightly adapted version of Radio 1 is broadcast as RTÉ Europe on Eurobird; the main difference between this and the main FM feed is the inclusion of several programmes taken from RTÉ Raidió na Gaeltachta. RTE Radio is available on the UK Freesat service.

DAB test broadcasts of RTÉ's four stations began on 1 January 2006, along the east coast of Ireland, also carrying the private Today FM and World Radio Network, to which RTÉ is a contributing broadcaster. DAB was launched to the public in late 2006, and now contains six RTÉ digital-only stations – RTÉ 2XM, RTÉ Chill, RTÉ Gold, RTÉ Junior, RTÉ Pulse and RTÉ Radio 1 Extra – as well as the four terrestrial services. There were also two other DAB Services, RTÉ Digital Radio News and RTÉ Choice, both of which have been shut down. RTÉ's radio stations are also carried on digital cable and satellite platforms in Ireland, as well as on digital terrestrial television, and RTÉ Radio 1 has been carried on shortwave in DRM during specific events, including the All Ireland finals.

A survey carried out by the Department of Community, Rural and Gaeltacht Affairs showed that demand for an Irish-language radio station aimed at a younger audience than RTÉ Raidió na Gaeltachta was high. This means that RTÉ might have plans to launch such a radio station.

In August 2009, faced with falling audience listening figures, a media analyst, David Quinn, organiser of the religiously motivated Iona Institute pressure group, advised that RTÉ has "alienated some of the audience it ought to be going after" and should "try to be more even-handed in its treatment of the issues of the day instead of pushing every PC cause going."

With the closure of Saor Raidió Chonamara ("Free Radio Connemara"), it showed the importance and it showed awareness for the Irish language. With this in mind, it forced RTÉ to agree to join with Raidió na Gaeltachta, which is still present today.

Television

In Ireland, RTÉ One and RTÉ2 are RTÉ's flagship channels and are broadcast on Saorview (Ireland's digital television system) along with, RTÉ News Now, RTÉjr and timeshift services, RTÉ One +1, and RTÉ2+1. RTÉ Television also offers two further services: RTÉ Live, where viewers can watch RTÉ as it broadcasts live on the internet, using programming from both RTÉ One and RTÉ2 and RTÉ Player an on-demand video service. Both of these services are available on a national and international basis.

Timeline

1920s
Ireland was one of the first countries in Europe to embrace the medium of radio, but was a relative latecomer to television. Unlike its European counterparts, the Government of Ireland did not use the medium of television until 31 December 1961. Countries such as the United Kingdom (1929), France (1935) and Italy (1954) embraced television long before Ireland. Prior to the launch of RTÉ as the national broadcaster, television services were available, though limited, from Northern Ireland through BBC Northern Ireland (1955) and UTV (1959) . The development of the Divis transmitter in Northern Ireland in July 1955 allowed overspill of these services into the Republic.

1950s
In the late 1950s, a Television Committee was formed; its goal was to set up an Irish television service with as little financial support as possible from the government. It initially recommended setting up a service along the lines of ITV, using five mountain tops as transmission sites, which were also equipped for FM radio transmission. However, since Éamon de Valera was somewhat wary of television, nothing more of consequence was done until Seán Lemass succeeded him as Taoiseach in 1959. A year later, Radio Éireann was converted from an arm of the Department of Posts and Telegraphs into a semi-state body and given responsibility for television. Eamonn Andrews was appointed as the new chairman. A site for a new Television Production Centre had been found in 1959, and its construction started in October 1960.

1960s
Telefís Éireann began broadcasting at 19:00 on New Year's Eve, 1961. The channel was launched with opening address by the then President de Valera. There were other messages from Cardinal d'Alton and Lemass; following this, a live concert was broadcast from the Gresham Hotel in Dublin. The show, which was a countdown to the New Year, was hosted by Andrews, with appearances by tenor Patrick O'Hagan (father of Johnny Logan), the Artane Boys' Band and Michael O'Hehir. Television became an important force within Irish culture as it helped to explore topics often deemed controversial such as abortion and contraception. The development of entertainment show The Late Late Show, began in July 1962 and is still broadcasting today. Such programming helped to influence in the changing social structure of Ireland. Telefís Éireann began to explore children's television at this point producing the groundbreaking show Wanderly Wagon which inspired a generation with characters like Judge and Mr Crow.

1970s
In 1978, the Government of Ireland approved the launch of a second public service channel to be operated by RTÉ. RTÉ2 (later rebranded as Network 2 in 1988 and renamed RTÉ Two in 2004) had a public service remit providing Irish-language services, while also offering alternative services – mainly programming from the US and UK.

1990s
During the 1990s similar to other European broadcasters RTÉ began to expand its services to provide regional variations. RTÉ developed its only major studio complex outside Dublin in Cork. RTÉ Cork, opened in 1995 and became a huge success. It also became a large contributor to network output on both Radio One and RTÉ One. Also in 1995, RTÉ opened a regional broadcasting studio in Limerick for broadcasts in the Limerick area. In 1996, an Irish-language television service was launched TG4 (previously Teilifís na Gaeilge) was launched from Galway. While RTÉ provided Irish-language services such as news bulletins (Nuacht) and the long-running documentary series Léargas.

2000s
RTÉ Television began to expand its output through the development of digital television. RTÉ Television services became widely available in Northern Ireland via terrestrial overspill or on cable (coverage and inclusion on cable systems varies). Since 23 April 2002 (18 April 2005 in Northern Ireland) the channels have also been available via satellite on Sky; however, some sports programmes and other shows are blocked to Northern Ireland viewers due to rights issues that conflict with the UK.

In January 2007, RTÉ announced plans to launch a channel, with the working title of RTÉ International, which would offer programmes from RTÉ One and Two as well as TG4. however  this service has still to materialise.

2010s
On 26 May 2011, RTÉ television launched the public service mux for digital terrestrial television known as Saorview and Saorsat. RTÉ also launched RTÉ Two HD, RTÉjr, RTÉ One+1 and RTÉ News Now on Saorview on the same day.

For the 50th anniversary of the start of RTÉ television John Bowman produced a history of RTÉ Television titled: Window and Mirror. RTÉ Television: 1961–2011, which was launched by Taoiseach Enda Kenny at the National Museum in Dublin on 23 November 2011.

At 10:00 am on 24 October 2012 all analogue television transmissions ended in Ireland, and RTÉ's television channels are now only available digitally on Saorview, satellite, and cable. Also on 24 October 2012, for the first time RTÉ 1 and RTÉ 2 were broadcast from transmitters within Northern Ireland on the UK Freeview system.

In December 2014, RTÉ made television advertising history by airing the first-ever native HD advert in the UK and Ireland. The commercial was part of the 3 Mobile Christmas campaign. It was created by Dublin creative agency Boys & Girls and was delivered by global delivery specialists IMD.

News

RTÉ News and Current Affairs, or Nuacht agus Cúrsaí Reatha RTÉ in Irish, is a major division of Raidió Teilifís Éireann responsible for news programming on television, radio and online within Ireland. It is, by far, the largest and most popular news source in Ireland – with 77% of the Irish public regarding it as their main source of both Irish and international news. It broadcasts in both the Irish and English languages, as well as Irish Sign Language.

RTÉ News and Current Affairs provides a range of national and international news and current affairs programming in Ireland. The organisation is also a source of commentary on current affairs. RTÉ News is based at the RTÉ Television Complex at Montrose in Donnybrook, Dublin, Ireland. However, the station also operates regional bureaux across Ireland and the world.

RTÉ News faces competition from within Ireland and abroad. Within Ireland, competition is provided by 3News and Nuacht TG4 in the television sector and Communicorp in the radio sector. BBC Newsline and UTV Live provide alternative news services from Northern Ireland, whilst global news channels are widely available, such as Euronews, CNN International, CNBC, France 24, Bloomberg, BBC World News and Sky News among many others.

RTÉ News and Current Affairs produces over 1,000 hours of television programming and 2,000 hours of radio programming a year.

In the 1970s, Sinn Féin the Workers Party, (the political wing of the Official IRA), were said to have progressively infiltrated RTÉ's Current Affairs Department, through the Ned Stapleton Cumman, which was organised by Eoghan Harris.

RTÉ's gaffe in January 2009 over the need for IMF intervention in the Republic was picked up by news wires. Bloomberg noted how German stocks fell sharply, while Reuters reported that the euro dipped by a cent against the dollar before it stabilised following a strong denial.

RTÉ's producers and researchers were accused by journalist Kevin Myers of imposing a liberal agenda, firstly on one another, and later on the airwaves, but without consciously intending to do so. RTÉ News has also been described by him as behaving like a press officer for public sector unions.

Sport

RTÉ is a major broadcaster of sports programming in Ireland. Gaelic football, hurling, football and rugby are all broadcast live on radio and television and increasingly online. The broadcaster also transmits live golf, boxing, athletics, horse-racing and show-jumping and other minority sports, usually when there is a significant Irish participant(s), or the event is in Ireland. The broadcaster has secured many events, free-to-air which might otherwise become pay-per-view. They also have the broadcasting rights to broadcast the FIFA World Cup 2022.

Weather
Weather forecasts are provided at the end of most news on radio and television. Met Éireann have been providing the forecasts since 1948 to Radio Éireann and from 1962 on television broadcasts.

Internet

The URL  is the brand name and home of RTÉ's online activities. The site began publishing on 26 May 1996. It operates on an entirely commercial basis, receiving none of the licence fee which funds much of RTÉ's activity. The site is funded by advertising and section sponsorship. , it is among the top 5,000 most visited websites globally, by Alexa rankings and among the top 20 sites in Ireland, with certified impressions of almost 40 million per month and more than 1.5 million unique users. The most recent revamp of the website took place on 30 January 2007.

In recent years RTÉ has been expanding its web broadcasting capabilities. With improved access to online material and better methods of delivery, there is now a comprehensive range of services online. RTÉ streams all of its radio stations online, including digital, and there is a web-only TV channel, RTÉ News Now as well as the availability to watch live programmes, subject to copyright.

RTÉ Player
On Tuesday 21 April 2009, RTÉ launched its on-demand service the RTÉ Player. The service allows broadband users in Ireland to view some of RTÉ's top rated homegrown (i.e. RTÉ News, The Late Late Show) and international (i.e. Home and Away, Grey's Anatomy) TV series for free up to 21 days after its initial broadcast. A cut-down version is available outside Ireland.

RTÉ and Netflix
On Thursday, 13 September 2012: RTÉ Digital confirmed that it has signed a deal with Netflix to host its programming. Episodes of RTÉ television dramas and comedies, including The Clinic, Trivia, Killinaskully, and Mattie, will be added to Netflix and available outside Ireland under a new deal between the broadcaster and the online subscription service.

Other activities

Digital

RTÉ Digital division replaced the RTÉ Publishing division in 2012 and operates six media services 
  – providing online news, sport, and entertainment services
 RTÉ Player/RTÉ Radio Player – on demand and live streams of all of RTÉ's national radio and TV networks
 RTÉ Aertel – teletext service which has news, sport, and programme support information
 RTÉ News App – live/catch-up news service, online and on mobile 
 RTÉ Archives – central repository for all RTÉ broadcast (Television and Radio) and stills material collected and preserved by RTÉ

Areas of responsibility
Sale of music copyright
Maintenance of Television channel archives and news library
Sale of library and archive material
Maintenance of Radio channel archive and library
Provision of RTÉ Aertel teletext services
Provision of a range of free to public, public service web-based Online services
Operation of the RTÉ Player to domestic and international audiences
Sale of online banner advertising and sponsorship
Sale of teletext advertising and sponsorship
Commercial Telecoms revenue
Incubation and development of new media technologies
Administration of RTÉ Digital IBD
Provision of additional opportunities to access RTÉ's public service news content via RTÉ News Now Online

Orchestras Quartet & Choirs

RTÉ Orchestras Quartet & Choirs supports two full-time orchestras—the RTÉ Concert Orchestra and RTÉ National Symphony Orchestra—as well as the RTÉ Vanbrugh Quartet, RTÉ Philharmonic Choir, and RTÉ Cór na nÓg. These groups perform regularly in the National Concert Hall and The Helix in Dublin. The five groups present over 250 events annually, including live performances and work in education. The RTÉ NSO and the RTÉ CO employ 134 professional musicians. The RTÉ Philharmonic Choir and the children's choir RTÉ Cór na nÓg are for singers at an amateur level. Currently, approximately 200 adults and children are involved in the choirs.
 Performing Groups
 RTÉ National Symphony Orchestra
 RTÉ Concert Orchestra
 RTÉ Philharmonic Choir
 RTÉ Cór na nÓg
 RTÉ Vanbrugh Quartet

Infrastructure
RTÉ Networks (branded as 2RN) is operated through a wholly owned subsidiary company, RTÉ Network Transmission Limited, and provides transmission services for all of RTÉ's own channels and also for competing stations such as TV3 Ireland, TG4 and Today FM.

Saorview

Saorview, founded by 2RN, is the name for the Irish FTA DTT. The service was launched as a trial service on 31 October 2010 to 90% of the population and it was officially launched on 26 May 2011. Set-top boxes for the service are available By legislation it must be available nationwide by December 2011. The service is free although a MPEG-4 DVB-T box and a UHF aerial will be needed although some newer TV sets have MPEG-4 DVB-T decoders built into the TV set which do not need a separate box. 2RN can provide for commercial DTT capacity on its network for any pay TV service that can agree terms with it and the BAI. However that is likely until 2013 according to the BAI following on from a de-briefing exercise the BAI held with the three consortia involved in the 2008 failed license process. The BAI said "the Authority now considers that it will not be feasible to introduce commercial DTT as originally intended until after Analogue Switch Off (ASO) at the earliest. The position will be reviewed towards the end of 2011 and the Authority may seek expressions of interest in the provision of commercial DTT at that point. A competition could potentially be held during 2012 with a view to commercial DTT being operational in 2013." It continued "it is the considered view of the Authority that as part of the preparation for the successful launch of commercial DTT in the future, legislative change will be necessary to enable the Authority to have formal relationships with the applicants, as obtains at present, and with RTÉNL."
Analogue television transmission was ended on 24 October 2012 and Saorview became the primary source of Irish terrestrial television.

Saorsat
Saorsat is the proposed name for the free-to-air digital satellite television service in Ireland is expected that RTÉ will use a new satellite service to broadcast to homes in more remote areas of Ireland with the possibility of broadband provision by June 2011. On 14 July 2010 RTÉ NL outlined detailed plans for the digital terrestrial television (DTT) infrastructure project and digital satellite television (DST) using Ka narrowband, which will see the shut-down of the existing analogue system and launch of a domestic-only satellite service for the first time since establishment of RTÉ covering the area not possible due to terrain issues by DTT.

Library

Logo 

In 1995, the logo dropped the Brigid's cross, and for the first time placed an accent on the letter E. RTÉ also formal branded Network Two on screen as part of RTÉ until 1997, when the channel was once more re-branded on screen as N2. The three letters are a modern take on Celtic scripting. The Brigid's cross was seen on many RTÉ One television idents until 2003 and remains on the headed paper of RTÉ, while a variation of the 1966 cross is used by RTÉ's Graphic Design Department. Since 2004 all RTÉ service use the 1996 logo as part of their Identity.

In September 2014, RTÉ re-branded its network following a tending process introduced in February 2014. In 2015 RTÉ Archives launched a new logo which incorporated the 1969 branding for the word "Archive".

Moral controversies
The Late Late Show has been involved in a number of controversies since first being broadcast on TV in July 1962, particularly during Gay Byrne's tenure, with the "Bishop and the Nightie Affair" in 1966 and a 1985 interview with a pair of lesbian former nuns which led to protesters picketing the studio with hymns and rosary beads after a High Court case during which there were calls for the chat show to be outlawed over fears it would "greatly undermine Christian moral values" and "the respect of the general public for nuns". Notorious incidents during Pat Kenny's tenure included a satanic dance troupe performance and the tearing up of two tickets for The Late Late Toy Show live on air.

The first sex scandal on Irish TV surrounded a sketch-drawing advert for Bri-Nylon underwear, involving a "lewd and lascivious" cartoon of Antony and Cleopatra.

Wesley Burroughs received a dressing down from RTÉ authorities after it became apparent actress Biddy White Lennon, who portrayed the character Maggie Riordan, was becoming increasingly more pregnant looking every week on The Riordans, an RTÉ soap opera he wrote for. Maggie Riordan was an unmarried woman. Burroughs was forced to consult medical texts to provide Maggie with an alternative illness.

The TV drama series The Spike, broadcast on RTÉ in 1978, was involved in a sex scandal.

In 1986, Mandy Smith was to be interviewed on TV's Saturday Live until RTÉ decided she should be downgraded to being a mere member of the audience. She was axed entirely when her manager disagreed, with RTÉ saying she was "not important enough" and that she might "give a bad example to young teenage girls". The story appeared in the international media.

In 2017, RTÉ sports producer Kieran Creaven was convicted on multiple counts of child sexual abuse in the UK. He had worked with RTÉ since 2002.

See also
 List of programmes broadcast by RTÉ
 Television in Ireland

Further reading
 Jack Dowling, Lelia Doolan, Bob Quinn, Sit Down and be Counted: the cultural evolution of a television station, Wellington Publishers Ltd., Dublin, 1969.

References

External links

 
 A website showing the history of Irish TV
 Major changes heralded in broadcasting as new laws enacted

 
Publicly funded broadcasters
State-sponsored bodies of the Republic of Ireland
Television networks in Ireland
European Broadcasting Union members
Multilingual broadcasters
Department of Tourism, Culture, Arts, Gaeltacht, Sport and Media
Mass media companies established in 1960
Television channels and stations established in 1960
Radio stations established in 1926
Peabody Award winners
Irish news websites
1960 establishments in Ireland